The twenty-first series of the British television drama series Grange Hill began broadcasting on 27 January 1998, before ending on 2 April 1998 on BBC One. The series follows the lives of the staff and pupils of the eponymous school, an inner-city London comprehensive school. It consists of twenty episodes.

Cast

Pupils

Teachers

Others

Episodes

DVD release
The twenty-first series of Grange Hill has never been released on DVD as of 2016.

Notes

References

1998 British television seasons
Grange Hill